Todd Woodbridge and Mark Woodforde defeated Grant Connell and Patrick Galbraith in the final, 7–5, 6–3, 7–6(7–4) to win the gentlemen's doubles title at the 1993 Wimbledon Championships. It was the Woodies' first Wimbledon title, their second major title overall, and their second step towards the career Super Slam.

John McEnroe and Michael Stich were the reigning champions, but McEnroe did not compete this year. Stich partnered Wayne Ferreira, but was defeated in the third round by Jeremy Bates and Byron Black.

Seeds

  Todd Woodbridge /  Mark Woodforde (champions)
  John Fitzgerald /  Anders Järryd (second round)
  Patrick McEnroe /  Jonathan Stark (quarterfinals)
  Mark Kratzmann /  Wally Masur (second round)
  Grant Connell /  Patrick Galbraith (final)
  Danie Visser /  Laurie Warder (third round)
  Jacco Eltingh /  Mark Koevermans (first round)
  Steve DeVries /  David Macpherson (first round)
  Luke Jensen /  Murphy Jensen (second round)
  Wayne Ferreira /  Michael Stich (third round)
  Sergio Casal /  Jakob Hlasek (first round)
  Ken Flach /  Rick Leach (second round)
  Shelby Cannon /  Scott Melville (second round)
  David Adams /  Andrei Olhovskiy (second round, withdrew)
  Richey Reneberg /  David Wheaton (second round)
  Glenn Michibata /  David Pate (second round)

Qualifying

Draw

Finals

Top half

Section 1

Section 2

Bottom half

Section 3

Section 4

References

External links

1993 Wimbledon Championships – Men's draws and results at the International Tennis Federation

Men's Doubles
Wimbledon Championship by year – Men's doubles